Tretopteryx is a genus of snout moths. It was described by Ragonot in 1890. It contains only one species, Tretopteryx pertusalis, which is found in France, on Crete and in Turkey and Syria.

The wingspan is about 27 mm.

References

Pyralini
Monotypic moth genera
Moths of Europe
Moths of Asia
Moths described in 1832
Pyralidae genera